Matheus Lima Magalhães (born 29 March 1992), known simply as Matheus, is a Brazilian professional footballer who plays for Portuguese club S.C. Braga as a goalkeeper.

Formed at América Mineiro, he spent most of his career at Braga in Portugal, making over 250 appearances and winning the Taça de Portugal twice and the Taça da Liga once.

Club career

América Mineiro
Born in Belo Horizonte, Minas Gerais, Matheus joined América Futebol Clube (MG)'s youth setup in 2008, aged 13. Ahead of the 2012 season, he was promoted to the first team after impressing in the 2011 Campeonato Brasileiro Sub-20.

Matheus made his professional debut on 19 September 2012, coming on as a second-half substitute for field player Fábio Júnior as starter Neneca was sent off, in a 2–0 away loss against Clube Atlético Bragantino for the Série B championship. The following June, he was chosen as first choice by manager Paulo Comelli, and retained his position during the campaign.

Braga
On 4 July 2014, Matheus moved abroad and signed a five-year contract with Portuguese club S.C. Braga. He made his Primeira Liga debut on 27 September in a 3–0 home defeat of Rio Ave FC, and finished his first season as starter ahead of Stanislav Kritsyuk and compatriot Victor Golas after being delayed by bureaucratic problems.

Matheus lost his starting spot to José Marafona in the following campaigns, missing the Taça de Portugal final win over FC Porto in 2016 after playing the earlier rounds. He made his continental debut in the same season's UEFA Europa League, playing 12 games and only receiving a yellow card in the quarter-final elimination away to FC Shakhtar Donetsk on 14 April, after conceding a penalty through a foul on Viktor Kovalenko. 

Matheus returned to the starting XI in 2017–18 after Marafone was injured, and on 15 March 2018 he renewed his contract until 2023. He played every minute of the  campaign, in which his club finished fourth; only five other players in the league matched his feat, three of whom shared his position. 

Matheus suffered a severe knee injury in late August 2018, after which Tiago Sá had a run in the team. He returned to his starting role for the 2019–20 season, playing four games in the Taça da Liga that year, including the 1–0 win over Porto in the final on 25 January; he featured in as many games in the 2020–21 Taça de Portugal which ended with a 2–0 win over S.L. Benfica. 

In the following season's Europa League, Matheus made two saves in a penalty shootout win over FC Sheriff Tiraspol in the knockout round play-off on 24 February 2022, and days after the last-eight elimination by Rangers in April he extended his contract to 2027. On 12 August, after a 3–0 win at nearby F.C. Famalicão, he reached 250 games for the Minho club. He was sent off for them for the first time on 30 September for a foul on Mehdi Taremi.

Personal life
Matheus' older brother, Moisés, is also a footballer. A midfielder, he too started his career at América Mineiro.

Honours
Braga
Taça de Portugal: 2015–16 2020–21
Taça da Liga: 2019–20

References

External links

1992 births
Living people
Brazilian footballers
Footballers from Belo Horizonte
Association football goalkeepers
Campeonato Brasileiro Série B players
América Futebol Clube (MG) players
Primeira Liga players
S.C. Braga players
Brazilian expatriate footballers
Expatriate footballers in Portugal
Brazilian expatriate sportspeople in Portugal